Charles Dana Gibson (September 14, 1867 – December 23, 1944) was an American illustrator.  He was best known for his creation of the Gibson Girl, an iconic representation of the beautiful and independent Euro-American woman at the turn of the 20th century.

He published his illustrations in Life magazine and other major national publications for more than 30 years, becoming editor in 1918 and later owner of the general interest magazine.

Early life
Gibson was born in Roxbury, Massachusetts on September 14, 1867.  He was a son of Josephine Elizabeth (née Lovett) and Charles DeWolf Gibson. He had five siblings  and was a descendant of U.S. Senators James DeWolf and William Bradford.

A talented youth with an early interest in art, Gibson was enrolled by his parents in New York City's Art Students League, where he studied for two years.

Career

Peddling his pen-and-ink sketches, Gibson sold his first work in 1886 to Life magazine, founded by John Ames Mitchell and Andrew Miller. It featured general interest articles, humor, illustrations, and cartoons. His works appeared weekly in the popular national magazine for more than 30 years. He quickly built a wider reputation, with his drawings being featured in all the major New York publications, including Harper's Weekly, Scribners and Collier's. His illustrated books include the 1898 editions of Anthony Hope's The Prisoner of Zenda and its sequel Rupert of Hentzau as well as Richard Harding Davis' Gallegher and Other Stories.

It is an oft-repeated urban legend that Gibson's wife and her elegant Langhorne sisters inspired his famous Gibson Girls, who became iconic images in early 20th-century society. In truth is that the first Gibson Girl appeared in 1890, more than two years before Gibson ever met the Langhorne family, and in later years it became fashionable for many of Gibson's friends and family to model for his illustrations. Their dynamic and resourceful father Chiswell Langhorne had his wealth severely reduced by the Civil War, but by the late 19th century, he had rebuilt his fortune on tobacco auctioneering and the railroad industry.

After the death of John Ames Mitchell in 1918, Gibson became editor of Life and later took over as owner of the magazine. As the popularity of the Gibson Girl faded after World War I, Gibson took to working in oils for his own pleasure. In 1918, he was elected into the National Academy of Design as an Associate member, and became a full Academician in 1932.

He retired in 1936, the same year Scribner's published his biography, Portrait of an Era as Drawn by C. D. Gibson: A Biography by Fairfax Downey. At the time of his death in 1944, he was considered "the most celebrated pen-and-ink artist of his time as well as a painter applauded by the critics of his later work."

Personal life 

On November 7, 1895, Gibson was married to Irene Langhorne (1873–1956), a daughter of railroad industrialist Chiswell Langhorne. Irene was born in Danville, Virginia, and was one of five sisters, all noted for their beauty, including Nancy Astor, Viscountess Astor, the first woman to serve as a Member of Parliament (MP) in the House of Commons of the United Kingdom.  Together, Irene and Charles were the parents of two children:

 Irene Langhorne Gibson (1897–1973), who married George Browne Post III (1890–1952), a grandson of architect George B. Post, in 1916. They divorced and she married real estate developer John Josiah Emery (1898–1976) in 1926.
 Langhorne Gibson (1899–1982), who married Marion Taylor (1902–1960) in 1922. He later married Parthenia Burke Ross (1911–1998) in 1936.

For part of his career, Gibson lived in New Rochelle, New York, a popular art colony among actors, writers and artists of the period. The community was most well known for its unprecedented number of prominent American illustrators.  Gibson also owned an island off Islesboro, Maine which came to be known as 700 Acre Island; he and his wife spent an increasing amount of time here through the years.

Gibson died of a heart ailment in 1944, aged 77, at 127 East 73rd Street, his home in New York City.  After a private funeral service at the Gibson home in New York, he was interred at Mount Auburn Cemetery in Cambridge, Massachusetts.  His widow died at her home in Greenwood, Virginia in April 1956 at the age of 83.

Legacy
Almost unrestricted merchandising saw his distinctive sketches appear in many forms. The Gibson cocktail has been claimed to be named after him, as it is said he favored ordering gin martinis with a pickled onion garnish in place of the traditional olive or lemon zest.

Work

See also
Longfield (Charles Dana Gibson House)

Citations

General and cited sources

External links

 
 
 
 
 

1867 births
1944 deaths
19th-century American artists
American cartoonists
American illustrators
Art Students League of New York alumni
Artists from New Rochelle, New York
Burials at Mount Auburn Cemetery
DeWolf family
Members of the Salmagundi Club
People from Islesboro, Maine
People from Roxbury, Boston
Pin-up artists
Presidents of the Society of Illustrators
Members of the American Academy of Arts and Letters